Nenad Baćina (born July 29, 1971) is a former Croatian footballer and football manager, who is an assistant manager of Kuala Lumpur City

Club career
Baćina was born in 1971 in Split, Croatia. As a professional football player he played with several Croatian First League clubs, NK Primorac, NK Mladost 127, NK Belišće, between 1989 and 1999.

Between 2000 and 2005 he played at the Singaporean S-League club Singapore Armed Forces Football Club (SAFFC), and he won two S-League Championships in 2000 and 2002. For three seasons he was the team captain.

During his professional football playing career he graduated at the University of Split as a professor of Physical Education and Sport Science.

Manager career
In 2005, he started his coaching career as the youth development coach at the NK Spinut Soccer Clinic in Croatia.

Three years later, 2008, he joined Malaysian Super League club PDRM FC as the Head Coach Advisor and Technical Consultant during Malaysian Cup competition. PDRM FC reached the Malaysia Cup quarterfinals.

In 2009, Baćina was appointed as the head coach of Woodlands Wellington FC in Singapore professional S-League.

From February 2010 till June 2011 he was the senior team head coach assistant and head coach of Football Academy at NK Sloga in Croatia.

In December 2011 he was appointed the head coach of FC Hougang United in the Singapore professional S-League.

In December 2012 he was appointed as the head coach of Tampines Rovers Football Club, defending champion of the Singapore S-League. he was relieved from his job in May 2013 after perceived failure in the AFC Cup, although the club were leading the S.League at the time of his dismissal.

Bacina was named as assistant manager of Malaysian club Johor Darul Ta'zim F.C. in March 2014, assisting his compatriot Bojan Hodak.
May 2015 Bacina is appointed as the manager of Johor Darul Ta'zim II F.C.
Nenad Baćina holds a UEFA PRO Coaching License.

In 2016, Baćina was appointed as the team manager and head coach of Penang FA.

In August 2017 Baćina was appointed as the assistant manager of Malaysia national under-19 football team.

In February 2020 he was appointed as the assistant manager of PSM Makassar, again assisting his compatriot Bojan Hodak.

In April 2021 Baćina returns to Malaysia Super League as assistant manager of Kuala Lumpur F.C.
With Kuala Lumpur City, he was crowned as Malaysia Cup 2021 Champion and AFC Cup 2022 Runner up.

In December 2022, Baćina was appointed as director of Academy of Saudi Arabian team Al-Fayha FC Al-Fayha FC.

References

6. https://web.archive.org/web/20131025053025/http://kallangroar.com/news/exclusive-interviews/coffee-with-nenad-bacina-part-one/

7. https://web.archive.org/web/20130928164320/http://kallangroar.com/news/exclusive-interviews/coffee-with-ex-tampines-rovers-coach-nenad-bacina-part-2-final/

8.http://www.dalmacijanews.com/Nogomet/View/tabid/89/ID/109205/Nenad-Bacina-je-hit-trener-u-Singapuru-Najteze-se-dokazati-u-svojoj-sredini.aspx

9.http://www.foxsportsasia.com/editorial/news/detail/item886958/2012-S-League-Team-of-the-Season/

10. https://web.archive.org/web/20170930121027/https://www.fourfourtwo.com/sg/features/sleague-old-boys-nenad-bacina-croat-a-soft-spot-singapore

1971 births
Living people
Footballers from Split, Croatia
Association football defenders
Croatian footballers
NK Primorac 1929 players
HNK Suhopolje players
NK Belišće players
Warriors FC players
Croatian Football League players
Singapore Premier League players
Expatriate footballers in Singapore
Croatian expatriate sportspeople in Singapore
Croatian football managers
Woodlands Wellington FC head coaches
Hougang United FC head coaches
Tampines Rovers FC head coaches
Penang F.C. managers
Singapore Premier League head coaches
Croatian expatriate football managers
Expatriate football managers in Malaysia
Croatian expatriate sportspeople in Malaysia
Expatriate football managers in Singapore